Jabba Desilijic Tiure, more commonly known as Jabba the Hutt, is a fictional character and minor antagonist in the Star Wars franchise. Created by George Lucas, Jabba is voiced by Larry Ward with several puppeteers inside a one-ton puppet portraying him in Return of the Jedi. He was originally supposed to first appear in Star Wars (1977) as a stop motion character with Declan Mulholland as his stand-in. Jabba was later added into the film as a CGI character when it was re-released in Special Edition in 1997. He also appears in the prequel movie The Phantom Menace. The character is a large slug-like creature based on annelid worms and originally designed as an apelike figure.

In the films, Jabba is a powerful crime lord on the planet Tatooine, who is of the Hutt species. He is obese and often exemplifies his characterizations of lust and greed by having slave alien girls in his throne room. He places a bounty on smuggler Han Solo, sending several bounty hunters to capture him. Boba Fett captures Han Solo, Darth Vader freezes him, and after Boba Fett delivers him Jabba puts Han Solo on display in his palace. Later, Princess Leia comes to save Han but is captured by Jabba, who turns her into a slave. While Luke Skywalker comes to rescue them, Leia chokes Jabba to death by wrapping the chain connected to her around his neck. Outside of the main films, Jabba first appears in the Marvel comics with the appearance of a slim humanoid with a walrus-like face.

Jabba has received generally positive reviews from critics. However, his appearance as a CGI versus as a puppet has been disputed by many, with most being disappointed in his CGI, but applauding his look as a puppet. His name has entered common parlance as being synonymous with negative qualities such as morbid obesity, corruption, and corporate greed.

Concept, creation, and portrayal

Episode IV: A New Hope 
The original script to Star Wars describes Jabba as a "fat, slug-like creature with eyes on extended feelers and a huge ugly mouth", but Lucas stated in an interview that the initial character he had in mind was much furrier and resembled a Wookiee. When filming the scene between Han Solo and Jabba in 1976, Lucas employed Northern Irish actor Declan Mulholland to stand in for Jabba the Hutt, wearing a shaggy brown costume. Lucas planned to replace Mulholland in post-production with a stop-motion creature. The scene was meant to connect Star Wars to Return of the Jedi and explain why Han Solo was imprisoned at the end of The Empire Strikes Back. Nevertheless, Lucas decided to leave the scene out of the final film on account of budget, time constraints, and because he felt that it did not enhance the film's plot.

Lucas revisited the scene in the 1997 Special Edition release of A New Hope, restoring the sequence and replacing Mulholland with a CGI version of Jabba the Hutt. He also replaced the English dialogue with Huttese, a fictional language created by sound designer Ben Burtt. Joseph Letteri, the visual effects supervisor for the Special Edition, explained that the ultimate goal of the revised scene was to make it look as if Jabba the Hutt was actually on the set talking to and acting with Harrison Ford with the crew looking like they had merely photographed it. Letteri stated that the new scene consisted of five shots that took over a year to complete. The scene was polished further for the 2004 release on DVD, improving Jabba's appearance with advancements in CGI techniques.

At one point of the original scene, Ford walks behind Mulholland. This became a problem when adding the CGI Jabba since his tail would be in the way. The solution was to have Solo step on Jabba's tail, causing him to grunt in pain. In the 2004 DVD release, Jabba reacts more strongly, winding up as if to punch Han. In this version, shadows of Han can be seen on Jabba's body to make the CGI more convincing.

Lucas confessed that people were disappointingly upset about the CGI of Jabba's appearance, complaining that the character "looked fake". Lucas dismisses this, stating that whether a character is ultimately portrayed as a puppet or as CGI, it will always be "fake" since the character is ultimately not real. He says he sees no difference between a puppet made of latex and one generated by a computer. According to Greedo's actor Paul Blake, his own character's scene was created in response to Lucas having to cut the Jabba scene.

Episode VI: Return of the Jedi 

Lucas based the CGI on the character as he originally appeared in Return of the Jedi. In this film, Jabba the Hutt is an immense, sedentary, slug-like creature designed by Lucas's Industrial Light & Magic Creature Shop. Design consultant Ralph McQuarrie claimed, "In my sketches Jabba was huge, agile, sort of an apelike figure. But then the design went into another direction, and Jabba became more like a worm kind of creature." According to the 1985 documentary From Star Wars to Jedi, Lucas rejected initial designs of the character. One made Jabba appear too human—almost like a Fu Manchu character—while a second made him look too snail-like. Lucas finally settled on a design that was a hybrid of the two, drawing for further inspiration on an O'Galop cartoon figure flanking an early depiction of Bibendum. Return of the Jedi costume designer Nilo Rodis-Jamero commented, My vision of Jabba was literally Orson Welles when he was older. I saw him as a very refined man. Most of the villains we like are very smart people. But Phil Tippett kept imagining him as some kind of slug, almost like in Alice in Wonderland. At one time he sculpted a creature that looked like a slug that's smoking. I kept thinking I must be really off, but eventually that's where it led up to."

Production, and design
Designed by visual effects artist Phil Tippett, Jabba the Hutt was inspired by the anatomy of several animal species. His body structure and reproductive processes were based on annelid worms, a hairless animal that has no skeleton and are hermaphroditic. Jabba's head was modeled after that of a snake, complete with bulbous, slit-pupilled eyes and a mouth that opens wide enough to swallow large prey. Moist, amphibian qualities were given to his skin. Jabba's design would come to represent almost all members of the Hutt species in subsequent Star Wars fiction.

In Return of the Jedi, Jabba is portrayed by a one-ton puppet that took three months and half a million dollars to construct. While filming the movie, the puppet had its own makeup artist. The puppet required three puppeteers to operate, making it one of the largest ever used in a motion picture. Stuart Freeborn designed the puppet, while John Coppinger sculpted its latex, clay, and foam pieces. The puppeteers included David Alan Barclay, Toby Philpott, and Mike Edmonds, who were members of Jim Henson's Muppet group. Barclay operated the right arm and mouth and read the character's English dialogue, while Philpott controlled the left arm, head, and tongue. The tongue was a light beige color and came out of Jabba’s mouth several times. When he encountered Leia Organa for the first time and enslaved her, he extended his tongue and licked at her face. Leia reacted with such disgust upon seeing the tongue because, in one take, Philpott moved the tongue closer than what Carrie Fisher was comfortable with, and it licked her unintentionally. Edmonds, the shortest of the three men, who also played the Ewok Logray in later scenes, was responsible for the movement of Jabba's tail. Tony Cox, who also played an Ewok, would assist as well. The eyes and facial expressions were operated by radio control.

Lucas voiced displeasure in the puppet's appearance and immobility, complaining that the puppet had to be moved around the set to film different scenes. In the DVD commentary to the Special Edition of Return of the Jedi, Lucas notes that, if the technology had been available in 1983, Jabba the Hutt would have been a CGI character similar to the one that appears in the Special Edition scene of A New Hope.

Jabba the Hutt only speaks Huttese on film, but his lines are subtitled in English. His voice and Huttese-language dialogue were performed by the uncredited voice of Larry Ward. A heavy, booming quality was given to Ward's voice by pitching it an octave lower than normal and processing it through a subharmonic generator. A soundtrack of wet, slimy sound effects was recorded to accompany the movement of the puppet's limbs and mouth.

Jabba the Hutt's musical theme throughout the film, composed by John Williams, is played on a tuba. The theme is very similar to one which Williams wrote for a heavyset character in Fitzwilly (1967), though the theme does not appear on that film's soundtrack album. Williams later turned the theme into a symphonic piece performed by the Boston Pops Orchestra featuring a tuba solo by Chester Schmitz. The role of the piece in film and popular culture has become a focus of study by musicologists such as Gerald Sloan, who says that Williams' piece "blends the monstrous and the lyrical."

According to film historian Laurent Bouzereau, Jabba the Hutt's death in Return of the Jedi was suggested by script writer Lawrence Kasdan. Lucas decided that Leia should strangle him with her slave chain. He was inspired by a scene from The Godfather (1972) where an obese character named Luca Brasi (Lenny Montana) is garroted by an assassin.

Other portrayals
Jabba was voiced by Scott Schumann in post-1997 editions of Star Wars and in The Phantom Menace. In The Phantom Menace end credits, Jabba was jokingly credited as playing himself. In the radio drama adaption of the original trilogy, Jabba is played by Ed Asner.

Characterization 

Jabba the Hutt exemplifies lust, greed, and gluttony. The character is known throughout the Star Wars universe as a "vile gangster" who amuses himself by torturing and humiliating his subjects and enemies. He surrounds himself with scantily-clad slave girls of all species, chained to his dais. The Star Wars Databank remarks that residents of his palace are not safe from his desire to dominate and torture: in Return of the Jedi, the Twi'lek slave dancer Oola is fed to Jabba's pet rancor.

Jabba the Hutt's physical appearance reinforces his personality as a criminal deviant. In Return of the Jedi, Han Solo calls Jabba a "slimy piece of worm-ridden filth". Film critic Roger Ebert described him as "a cross between a toad and the Cheshire Cat." Incidentally, the word for "toad" or "frog" in Slavic languages (zhaba, жаба) sounds very close to "Jabba," while in Arabic حُوت (ḥūt) means "fish / whale". Science fiction writer Jeanne Cavelos wrote that Jabba deserved the "award for most disgusting alien". Science fiction authors Tom and Martha Veitch wrote that Jabba's body is a "miasmic mass", and that "[t]he Hutt's lardaceous body seemed to periodically release a greasy discharge, sending fresh waves of rotten stench" into the air. Jabba's appetite is insatiable, and some authors portray him threatening to eat his subordinates. The Hollywood Reporters Arthur Knight called Jabba a "truly frightening... gross walrus-shaped grotesque."

Among Jabba's only displays of any positive qualities within the franchise occur in Star Wars: The Clone Wars, where he demonstrates genuine affection for his son Rotta and is worried by his kidnapping and angered by his supposed death. In one Expanded Universe story, Jabba prevents a Chevin named Ephant Mon from freezing to death on an ice planet; afterward, Ephant Mon becomes one of his most loyal servants.

Appearances

Star Wars films
Although briefly mentioned by Greedo and Han Solo in Star Wars and again by Han in The Empire Strikes Back, Jabba was first seen in 1983 in Return of the Jedi, the third installment of the original Star Wars trilogy. Directed by Richard Marquand and written by Lawrence Kasdan and George Lucas, the first act of Return of the Jedi features the attempts of Princess Leia Organa (Carrie Fisher), the Wookiee Chewbacca (Peter Mayhew), and Jedi Knight Luke Skywalker (Mark Hamill) to rescue their friend, the aforementioned Han Solo (Harrison Ford), who had been imprisoned in carbonite in the previous film, The Empire Strikes Back.

The captured Han is delivered to Jabba by bounty hunter Boba Fett (Jeremy Bulloch) and is placed on display in the crime lord's throne room as a decoration. Lando Calrissian (Billy Dee Williams), droids C-3PO (Anthony Daniels) and R2-D2 (Kenny Baker), Leia, and Chewbacca infiltrate Jabba's palace to save Han. Leia is able to free Han from the carbonite, but she is caught and enslaved by the Hutt. Chained to Jabba, she is forced to wear her iconic metal bikini. Luke arrives to "bargain for Solo's life", but Jabba rejects his offer and attempts to feed him to his pet rancor, an enormous monster. Luke kills the rancor, with him, Han, and Chewbacca condemned to be devoured by the sarlacc. At the Great Pit of Carkoon, Luke escapes execution with the help of R2-D2 and defeats Jabba's thugs. During the subsequent confusion, Leia chokes Jabba to death with the chain used to tether her to his throne. Luke, Leia, Han, Lando, Chewbacca, C-3PO, and R2-D2 escape, and Jabba's sail barge explodes over the sarlacc pit in the background.

The second film appearance of Jabba the Hutt was in the Special Edition of Star Wars, which was released in 1997 to commemorate the 20th anniversary of its release. In the original version, Han Solo disputes with the alien bounty hunter Greedo (Paul Blake and Maria De Aragon), whom he kills, and Jabba confirms Greedo's last words and demands that Han pay the value of the payload lost by him. Han promises to compensate Jabba as soon as he receives payment for delivering Obi-Wan Kenobi (Alec Guinness), Luke Skywalker, R2-D2, and C-3PO to Alderaan. Jabba agrees, but threatens to place a big price on Solo's head if he fails.

Jabba the Hutt made his third film appearance in the 1999 prequel Star Wars: Episode I – The Phantom Menace, set 36 years before Return of the Jedi. Jabba gives the order to begin a podrace at Mos Espa on Tatooine. With this done, Jabba falls asleep and misses the race's conclusion.

Jabba is referred to in the film Solo: A Star Wars Story (2018) by a young Han Solo's (Alden Ehrenreich) mentor Tobias Beckett (Woody Harrelson), who invites Han to join him in working for "big shot gangster" on Tatooine. At the end of the film, Han and Chewbacca decide to go to Tatooine for the job.

The Clone Wars
Jabba figures into the plot of the animated film Star Wars: The Clone Wars, wherein his son Rotta is captured by Separatists, where it is later revealed that Ziro, Jabba's uncle, took part in the kidnapping as part of his plan to take full control of the Hutt Clan. Jedi Knight Anakin Skywalker (voiced by Matt Lanter) and his Padawan Ahsoka Tano (voiced by Ashley Eckstein) return him to Jabba in exchange for the safe passage of Republic ships through his territory. This is backed up by Padme exposing Ziro's crimes to Jabba, who vows to ensure that Ziro will be punished severely.

Jabba subsequently appeared in a handful of episodes of The Clone Wars series, starting in the third season. In the episode "Sphere of Influence", wherein Jabba is faced by Chairman Papanoida, whose daughters were kidnapped by Greedo, Jabba allows a sample of Greedo's blood to be taken to prove him the kidnapper. In the episode "Evil Plans", Jabba hires the bounty hunter Cad Bane (voiced by Corey Burton) to bring him plans for the Senate building. When Bane returns successful, Jabba and the Hutt Council send Bane to free Ziro from prison. Jabba next makes a short appearance in the episode "Hunt for Ziro" in which he is seen laughing at his uncle's death at the hand of Sy Snootles (voiced by Nika Futterman), and pays her for delivering Ziro's holo-diary. In the fifth seasons episode "Eminence", Jabba and the Hutt Council are approached by Shadow Collective leaders Darth Maul (voiced by Sam Witwer), Savage Opress (voiced by Clancy Brown), and Pre Vizsla (voiced by Jon Favreau); when disappointed by these, Jabba sends bounty hunters Embo (voiced by Dave Filoni), Dengar (voiced by Simon Pegg), Sugi (voiced by Anna Graves), and Latts Razzi (voiced by Clare Grant) to capture them. After a battle, the Shadow Collective confront Jabba at his palace on Tatooine, where Jabba agrees to an alliance.

Other appearances

Expanded universe

The first released appearances of Jabba the Hutt in any visual capacity were in Marvel Comics' adaptation of A New Hope. In Six Against the Galaxy (1977) by Roy Thomas, What Ever Happened to Jabba the Hut? (1979) and In Mortal Combat (1980), both by Archie Goodwin, Jabba the Hutt, originally spelled Hut, appeared as a tall humanoid with a walrus-like face, a topknot, and a bright uniform. The official "Jabba" was not yet established as he had yet to be seen. 

While awaiting the sequel to Star Wars, Marvel kept the monthly comic going with their own stories. One of which includes Jabba tracking Han Solo and Chewbacca down to an old hideaway they use for smuggling. However, circumstances force Jabba to lift the bounty on Solo and Chewbacca, enabling them to return to Tatooine for an adventure with Luke Skywalker. In the course of another adventure, Solo kills the space pirate Crimson Jack and busts up his operation, which Jabba bankrolled. Jabba thus renews the reward for Solo's head. Solo later kills a bounty hunter who tells him why he is hunted once more. He and Chewbacca return to the Rebels, where in The Empire Strikes Back Solo mentions an incident with a "bounty hunter we ran into on Ord Mantell".

The Marvel artists based this Jabba on a character later named Mosep Binneed, an alien visible only briefly in the Mos Eisley Cantina scene of A New Hope. The 1977 mass-market paperback novelization of Lucas's Star Wars script describes Jabba as a "great mobile tub of muscle and suet topped by a shaggy scarred skull", but gives no further detail as to the character's physical appearance or species.

Later Star Wars novels and comics adopt a version of the character's image as seen in the film and greatly elaborate on his background and activities prior to the events of the Star Wars films. With the 2012 acquisition of Lucasfilm by The Walt Disney Company, all literature in this category was rebranded as Star Wars Legends and designated as non-canonical to any and all new media released after April 2014.

Zorba the Hutt's Revenge (1992), a young-adult novel by Paul and Hollace Davids, identifies Jabba's father as another powerful crime lord named Zorba and reveals that Jabba was born 596 years before the events of A New Hope, making him around 600 years old at the time of his death in Return of the Jedi. Four comics exploring Jabba's backstory were written by Jim Woodring and released by Dark Horse Comics in 1995–96; these were collected as Jabba the Hutt: The Art of the Deal in 1998. Ann C. Crispin's novel The Hutt Gambit (1997) explains how Jabba and Han Solo become business associates and portrays the events that lead to a bounty being placed on Han's head.

Tales from Jabba's Palace (1996), a collection of short stories edited by Kevin J. Anderson, pieces together the lives of Jabba the Hutt's various minions in his palace and their relationship to him during the last days of his life. These stories reveal that very few of the Hutt's servants are loyal to him, with many plans underway among their ranks to attempt his assassination. When Jabba the Hutt is killed in Return of the Jedi, his surviving former courtiers join forces with his rivals on Tatooine and his family on the Hutt homeworld Nal Hutta make claims to his palace, fortune, and criminal empire. Timothy Zahn's novel Heir to the Empire (1991) reveals that a smuggler named Talon Karrde eventually replaces Jabba as the "big fish in the pond" and moves the headquarters of the Hutt's criminal empire off of Tatooine.

Reception

Critical response 

Jabba the Hutt has received positive reviews from critics. The Telegraph said that Jabba the Hutt is one of the "films' most memorable Star Wars creatures". Blake Hawkins of Comic Book Resources said that Jabba the Hutt is "definitely one of the strangest, grossest things in Star Wars". Jabba the Hutt ranked #5 on the Forbes Fictional 15 list of wealthiest fictional characters in 2008. Business Insider's Travis Clark said, "Like Stormtroopers or Darth Vader, some villains just come to mind when you think of Star Wars. Jabba is another one of them." Lance Cartelli of GameSpot put Jabba at 12th for the greatest Star Wars villains. Declaring that Jabba is "without a doubt the finest Star Wars portrait of the id" and that you have to "admire his dedication of being his true, absolutely horrendous self", Jabba made it at Rolling Stone's 16th position for the 50 best Star Wars characters of all time.

Jabba the Hutt as a CGI in the re-release of A New Hope versus as a puppet in Return of the Jedi has been disputed with most saying that he looks better as a puppet. After the Hutt Twins’ first appearance in The Book of Boba Fett, Matt Singer of ScreenCrush wrote that no Hutt species should ever be CGI as it does not "look real". TheWraps Phil Owen said that the CGI Jabba looked "incredibly horrible". Matt Goldberg of Collider also said, "The CGI Jabba the Hutt looked awful." The Denver Post applauded the special effects team on Return of the Jedi for making Jabba look like a "horrid creature".

Mass media

The character's name has become an insulting term of disparagement. To say that someone "looks like Jabba the Hutt" is commonly understood as a slur to impugn that person's weight or appearance. Jabba the Hutt has also come to represent greed and anarchy, especially in the business world. Lindsey Boylan, the first accuser of New York's 56th Governor Andrew Cuomo for sexual harassment, compared Cuomo to Jabba the Hutt. Robin Mukherjee wrote about "inner selves" and described his "inner self" to Jabba the Hutt, stating: "It is pleasure-seeking to the point of gluttonous, has a sense of lust that seems to never be satisfied, and personifies the sin of sloth." The Turkish Cultural Community of Austria stated that a Lego toy set of Jabba's palace was racially biased of two religious structures in Turkey, because Jabba the Hutt is a "racial prejudice and vulgar insinuations against … Orientals and Asians as sneaky and criminal personalities." Carrie Fisher, actress of Princess Leia, said that if Donald Trump were to play a Star Wars character it would be Jabba the Hutt, because of the sexual allegations against him.

In popular culture 

With the premiere of Return of the Jedi in 1983 and the accompanying merchandising campaign, Jabba the Hutt has extended his popularity outside Star Wars. The character was produced and marketed as a series of action figure play sets by Kenner/Hasbro from 1983 to 2004. In the 1990s, Jabba the Hutt starred in his own comic book series, Jabba the Hutt: The Art of the Deal, which is a reference to the book of the same title by Donald Trump.

In Mel Brooks' Star Wars spoof film Spaceballs (1987), Jabba the Hutt is parodied as the character Pizza the Hutt, a cheesy blob shaped like a slice of pizza whose name is a double pun on Jabba the Hutt and the restaurant franchise Pizza Hut.

The Smithsonian Institution's National Air and Space Museum in Washington, D.C., included a display on Jabba the Hutt in the temporary exhibition Star Wars: The Magic of Myth, which closed in 1999. Jabba's display was called "The Hero's Return," referencing Luke Skywalker's journey toward becoming a Jedi. In 2012, a reduced scale of Jabba's barge, the Khetanna, was created in Huntington Beach, California, as a parade float for a Star Wars-themed charity relay.

Notes

References

Further reading
 Mangels, Andy. The Essential Guide to Characters. New York: Del Rey, 1995. .
 Reynolds, David West. Star Wars Episode I: The Visual Dictionary. New York: DK Publishing, 1999. .
 Wallace, Daniel and Kay How. The New Essential Guide to Characters. New York: Del Rey, 2002. .
 Wallace, Daniel, and Kevin J. Anderson. The New Essential Chronology. New York: Del Rey, 2005. .
 Wixted, Martin. Star Wars Galaxy Guide 7: Mos Eisley. Honesdale, Penn.: West End Games, 1993. .

External links
 
 

Characters created by George Lucas
Film characters introduced in 1983
Fictional arms dealers
Fictional crime bosses
Fictional criminals in films
Fictional dictators
Fictional gangsters
Fictional gamblers
Fictional gastropods
Fictional murdered people
Fictional murderers
Fictional slave owners
Fictional slave traders
Fictional torturers
Fictional kidnappers
Extraterrestrial supervillains
Male characters in film
Male characters in television
Star Wars animated characters
Star Wars puppets
Star Wars Skywalker Saga characters
Male film villains
Return of the Jedi
Film supervillains